Hans-Joachim Burgert (1928–2009) was a calligrapher, sculptor, and educator.

Work 
Burgert was instrumental in the foundation of the Berlin Calligraphy Collection at the Akademie der Künste. He donated seventy works to begin the collection. The works of Burgert, Friedrich Poppl, and Werner Schneider are considered the core of the Berlin Calligraphy Collection.

In addition to the Berlin Calligraphy Collection, Burgert's work is included in the collection of the Cooper Hewitt.

1980 he was awarded an award by the Hakone Museum, Japan.

Family 
Burgert was married to Benita (née von Hennigs) and was the father of two sons, including the artist Jonas Burgert.

References 

German male sculptors
German calligraphers
1928 births
2009 deaths